Cavanillesia is a genus of trees in the family Malvaceae. It is native to Panama and South America.

Taxonomy
Cavanillesia consists of 5 species so far:

 Cavanillesia arborea
 Cavanillesia chicamochae
 Cavanillesia hylogeiton
 Cavanillesia platanifolia
 Cavanillesia umbellata

References

Bombacoideae
Malvaceae genera
Taxonomy articles created by Polbot